The 2015 Rugby Football League Championship, known as the Kingstone Press Championship for sponsorship reasons, was a professional rugby league football competition played in the UK, one tier below the Super League.

The 2015 Championship featured twelve teams, who played each other twice in the regular season, once at home and once away, totaling 22 games. The 2015 season also saw for the first time the Summer Bash Weekend, which was played at Bloomfield Road, Blackpool and created an additional round of fixtures. After 23 rounds in both the Championship and the Super League, the two divisions of twelve were split into the Rugby League Super 8s.

Leigh Centurions were the league leaders after 23 rounds and were thus deemed Champions for the 2015 season, while Hunslet Hawks and Doncaster were relegated following the culmination of the Super 8s.

Teams
The competition featured 12 teams, as opposed to the 14 seen in the previous year. The teams consisted of nine of the 14 teams from 2014, the Play-off winner of the 2014 Championship 1 season, which was Hunslet Hawks, and the two sides relegated from 2014 Super League, Bradford Bulls and London Broncos. Keighley Cougars, North Wales Crusaders, Rochdale Hornets, Swinton Lions, and Barrow Raiders who finished in the bottom five in 2015 were relegated into League One for 2015.

Season standings

The regular league season saw the 12 teams play each other twice (one home, one away) over 24 matches. The top four teams at the end of the regular season qualified for "The Qualifiers", while the other eight teams contested the "Championship Shield".

The Qualifiers

The Qualifiers Super 8's saw the bottom 4 teams from Super League table join the top 4 teams from the Championship. The points totals are reset to 0 and each team plays 7 games each, playing every other team once. After 7 games each the teams finishing 1st, 2nd, and 3rd will gain qualification to the 2016 Super League season. The teams finishing 4th and 5th will play in the "Million Pound Game" at the home of the 4th place team which will earn the winner a place in the 2016 Super League; the loser, along with teams finishing 6th, 7th and 8th, will be relegated to the Championship.

Therefore, Wakefield are the final team to secure a spot in Super League XXI.

Championship Shield

The third of the three "Super 8" groups saw teams finishing 5th to 12th in the regular Championship table. Like the Super League 8's, these teams retained their original points and played 7 extra games, with the teams finishing in the top 4 places after these extra games contesting playoffs similar to Super League, with 1st v 4th and 2nd vs 3rd, with the winners contesting the Championship Shield Grand Final.
The two teams finishing at the bottom of this Super 8s group (7th and 8th) were relegated to the League 1 2016 season, and replaced by the two 2015 League One promoted sides.

(Q) Qualified for the semi-final
(R) Relegated to League 1

See also
 Championship
 2014 Championship 1
 British rugby league system
 Super League
 Rugby League Conference
 Northern Ford Premiership
 National League Cup
 Rugby League Reserve Team Championship

References

External links
Official Website

2015 in English rugby league
2015 in Welsh rugby league
Rugby Football League Championship